Shot Away is an album by English punk band, Vice Squad. It was released in 1984 by Anagram Records and was re-released by Anagram on CD with bonus tracks in 1994. It was the only album recorded by Vice Squad without singer Beki Bondage and is the last album to feature founding members Dave Bateman (guitar), Mark Hambly (bass) and Shane Baldwin (drums).

Track listing 
 "New Blood" (Dave Bateman, Mark Byrne) – 3:43
 "Take It or Leave It" (Bateman) – 4:07
 "Out in the Cold" (Byrne) – 3:10
 "Nowhere to Hide" (Bateman) – 4:10
 "You'll Never Know" (Bateman) – 3:32
 "Rebels and Kings" (Byrne) – 2:52
 "Playground" (Byrne) – 1:52
 "The Rest of Your Life" (Bateman) – 3:33
 "What's Going On?" (Bateman) – 3:44
 "Killing Time" (Bateman, Byrne) – 3:13
 "Teenage Rampage" (Michael Chapman, Nicky Chinn) – 3:37

1994 CD bonus tracks 
 "Black Sheep" (Bateman, Byrne) – 2:39
 "The Times They Are a-Changin'" (Bob Dylan) – 2:13
 "High Spirits" (Bateman) – 2:23
 "New Blood (Version)" (Bateman, Byrne) – 5:40
 "The Pledge" (Bateman, Byrne) – 3:44
 "Nothing" (Bateman, Byrne) – 1:56

Bonus track origins
 Tracks 12, 15 and 16 originally appeared on "Black Sheep" single
 Tracks 13 originally appeared on "You'll Never Know" single
 Tracks 14 originally appeared on "Teenage Rampage" single

Personnel
Vice Squad
 Lia – vocals
 Dave Bateman – guitar
 Mark Byrne – guitar
 Mark Hambly – bass
 Shane Baldwin – drums

Release history

References

Vice Squad albums
1984 albums